Unauthorized Termination is a 2006 work of interactive fiction written by Richard Otter about a senior investigator given a murder enquiry that is not everything it appears to be. It is written in ADRIFT 4 and came 10th in the 2006 annual Interactive Fiction Competition.
Unauthorized Termination was also a Nominee in the 2006 XYZZY Awards for Best Settings.

Plot
You are a senior investigator with the police force of what is basically a totalitarian state. On a world where nearly all forms of crime are punishable by execution, you have been called on to investigate someone who has been unlawfully killed. From the initial investigation it clearly looks like an accident and your superior is very keen for you to close the case. You decide to dig a little deeper and it is then that you uncover something that should probably have been better left hidden.  The Player character in this game is a robot.

Reception
In the 2006 Interactive Fiction Competition, Unauthorized Termination had an average score of 6.13.

A reviewer at ifdb.tads.org described Unauthorized Termination as "This was a charming game, and in a genre I haven't seen too much of: a murder mystery set completely in a world of robots."

Notes

References
 Game entry at Baf's guide
 List of works with link to download of Unauthorized Termination

2006 video games
2000s interactive fiction
Video games about police officers
Video games developed in the United Kingdom